Royal Challengers Bangalore (RCB) is a franchise cricket team based in Bangalore, India, which plays in the Indian Premier League (IPL). They were one of the eight teams that competed in the 2009 Indian Premier League. They were captained by Kevin Pietersen. Royal Challengers Bangalore finished runners-up in the IPL and qualified for the Champions League T20.

Indian Premier League season

Standings
Royal Challengers Bangalore finished 3rd in the league stage of IPL 2009.

Match log

Champions League Twenty20

Match log

References

2009 Indian Premier League
Royal Challengers Bangalore seasons
2000s in Bangalore